Parran was a telegraph station and post office in Churchill County, Nevada, United States. It was established in 1910 and closed in 1913. The abandoned site is currently considered a ghost town.

History 
Parran was first planned in 1902 as a telegraph station. The main idea was to serve a re-route through Hazen. The telegraph station and post office was officially opened on the 29th of January, 1910 and was closed on the 31st of July, 1913. It was built to assist the Kinney salt works, which only lasted seven years and shipped to farmers. The International Salt Company stopped working the project in 1912, which eventually lead to the closing of the station.

References 

Ghost towns in Churchill County, Nevada